Cathy MacAleavey (born 21 April 1958) is an Irish sailor. She competed in the women's 470 event at the 1988 Summer Olympics.

References

External links
 

1958 births
Living people
Irish female sailors (sport)
Olympic sailors of Ireland
Sailors at the 1988 Summer Olympics – 470
Place of birth missing (living people)